Life on Holidays is a 1980 Soviet drama film directed by Nikolai Gubenko.

Plot 
The film takes place in the autumn in the south of Crimea. The boarding house brought together people who are forced to entertain themselves. Among them were Nadezhda Andreyevna and Aleksey Sergeyevich, who fell in love with each other.

Cast 
 Regimantas Adomaitis as Aleksey Sergeyevich Pavlishchev
 Zhanna Bolotova as Nadezhda Andreyevna
 Georgi Burkov as Arkady Pavlovich
 Rolan Bykov as Viktor Leonidovich Lisyutkin
 Anatoly Solonitsyn as Tolik Chikin
 Lidiya Fedoseeva-Shukshina as Oksana
 Mariya Vinogradova as Margo / Margarita Serafimovna
 Viktor Filippov as Tractor-driver
 Mikheil Kherkheulidze as Mikheil Kherkheulidze		
 Tamara Yakobson as Olga Nikolaevna
 Rezo Esadze

References

External links 
 

1980 films
1980s Russian-language films
Soviet drama films
Films set in Crimea
1980 drama films